The Seldom Seen Kid is the fourth studio album by English rock band Elbow. It was released by Fiction Records on 17 March 2008 in the United Kingdom and was released by Geffen Records on 22 April 2008 in the United States. The album debuted at number five on the UK Albums Chart and won the Mercury Prize in 2008.

Production
The album was recorded at Blueprint Studios in Manchester, and is the first Elbow album to be entirely self-produced, mixed and recorded without any outside help. The bulk of the record was written and performed by the band, aside from a guest appearance from singer-songwriter Richard Hawley, who contributes guest vocals, lead guitar and co-songwriting on "The Fix". The Seldom Seen Kid also incorporated dynamic range and made note of this in its packaging, by promoting Turn Me Up! in the album's packaging.

The title of the album is taken from one of the characters who appears in US author Damon Runyon's humorous, idiosyncratic tales of gangster life on New York's Broadway in the 1920s. In addition to appearing as a lyric within the album's first single, "Grounds for Divorce", The Seldom Seen Kid is also a nickname, given by Guy Garvey's father, to Bryan Glancy, a fellow Mancunian musician and friend of the band who died suddenly in 2006. The closing track, "Friend of Ours", as well as the liner notes of the album, are dedicated in his memory.

Release
The album debuted at number five on the UK Albums Chart, the highest charting position of the band's career so far. The album was released in the UK in three versions: a regular CD in a super-jewel box, a digipak CD (both with one bonus track, "We're Away") and a double 12" vinyl LP.

The song "Grounds for Divorce" was featured in a TV ad for the video game Left 4 Dead. It is also featured in the trailer for the 2008 Coen Brothers film Burn After Reading. Samples of the song are also featured on the motoring series Top Gear. Furthermore, "Grounds For Divorce" has also been featured in a promo-ad for the 6th season of the hit TV-show House, as well as the Rescue Me season 5 episode Jump on 25 August 2009. It was also featured in the soundtrack for Colin McRae: Dirt 2. "Grounds For Divorce" was also a background track in the 2011 season finale of "In Plain Sight" on USA Network. The song also appears on the soundtrack for the video game Driver: San Francisco in 2011. In 2019 the song also appeared in the season 1 episode "No One's Gonna Harm You, Not While I'm Around" of The Morning Show, and is used as the closing song.

"Mirrorball" appears on Skins in 2009 on series 3 episode "Katie and Emily".

A version of the song "One Day Like This", without lyrics, was used as background and theming for the BBC's coverage of the 2008 Olympic Games. It was used in adverts for the film The Soloist, as well as an episode of Waterloo Road, and was included in The Official BBC Children in Need Medley.

On 17 January 2009, at Abbey Road Studios in London, the band played the album live with the BBC Concert Orchestra (conducted by Mike Dixon), featuring London choir Chantage. BBC Radio 2 broadcast the audio recording on Saturday 31 January, whilst the filmed event was made available on BBC interactive television via the red button.

The band released a special limited edition CD/DVD set of the performance, entitled The Seldom Seen Kid Live at Abbey Road, on 30 March 2009.

Reception

The album has received nearly unanimous praise from media outlets, including the NME and Planet Sound, which both gave Elbow their fourth consecutive 9/10 album rating.

The album won the Mercury Music Prize in 2008, an achievement which Guy Garvey declared to be "the best thing that's ever happened to us." The band were previously nominated for the award in 2001 with their debut album Asleep in the Back.

Commercially the album was well received, opening at number five on the UK album charts, but faded away quickly. However, after the Mercury nomination the album saw a revival to gain gold status, with its second single "One Day Like This" re-entering the top 40 singles listing after the award win. The album had a steady chart run afterwards (including a re-entry in the top ten), enabling it to benefit from the busy Christmas market, and eventually reach over 300,000 sales, making it eligible for platinum status. It has since sold 860,000 .

In July 2011, The Seldom Seen Kid climbed from No. 103 back to No. 59 in the album's 159th charting week, making it having charted for more than 3 years there.

The band also won Best British Group at the 2009 Brit Awards and picked up two awards at the 2009 Ivor Novello Awards.  "One Day Like This" won Best Song and "Grounds for Divorce" was Best Contemporary Song.

The album was also included in the book 1001 Albums You Must Hear Before You Die.

Track listing

On the UK version of the album, there are 23 seconds of silence after "Friend of Ours" before "We're Away" begins, making its running time 5:01.

Personnel

Elbow
Guy Garvey – vocals, string and brass arrangements
Mark Potter – guitars
Craig Potter – keyboards, trumpet
Pete Turner – bass
Richard Jupp – drums

Additional musicians
Richard Hawley – vocals, lead guitar on "The Fix"
Ian Burdge – cello, backing vocals
Prabjote Osahn – violin, backing vocals
Stella Page – violin, viola, backing vocals
Ben Parsons – cornet
Nick Smart – cornet, flugel
Matt Ball – trombone
Sheona White – E-flat horn
Tim Barber – trumpet
Elbow Choir – backing vocals
Angela Thwaite – backing vocals
Louise Turner – backing vocals

Production
 Craig Potter – production, mixing
 Danny Evans – additional engineering on "Grounds for Divorce" and "Friend of Ours"
 Danny McTague – additional engineering on "One Day Like This"
 Tim Young – mastering
 Mazen Murad – mastering on "We're Away"
 Oliver East – artwork
 Red Design – design

Charts and certifications

Weekly charts

Year-end charts

Certifications

Accolades

Singles
 "Grounds for Divorce" (10 March 2008) [released and deleted in the same week] UK# 19
 CD: b/w "Hotel Istanbul" – 7:01
 7" #1: b/w "Our Little Boat" – 2:58
 7" #2: b/w "A Regret" – 1:09
 "One Day Like This" (18 March 2008 – US; 2 June 2008 – UK) UK# 35
 US: one-track digital download only
 CD: b/w "Lullaby" – 3:13
 7" #1: b/w "Every Bit the Little Girl" – 4:32
 7" #2: b/w "Li'l Pissed Charmin' Tune" – 3:44
 "The Bones of You" (29 September 2008)
 Promo CD: "The Bones of You" (radio edit) – 3:06
 Digital download: b/w "The Bones of You" (Live at Manchester Academy) – 4:47

The Seldom Seen Kid Live at Abbey Road

The Seldom Seen Kid Live at Abbey Road was recorded live with the BBC Concert Orchestra at Abbey Road Studios on 17 January 2009. A special limited edition CD/DVD set was released by Fiction Records on 30 March 2009, featured inside a small box with individual card sleeves for each disc, as well as five postcards featuring photos of each band member, and a special booklet with photos commemorating the recording.

CD and DVD track listing

References

2008 albums
Elbow (band) albums
Mercury Prize-winning albums
Fiction Records albums
Polydor Records albums
Geffen Records albums